USS Chosin (CG-65) is a  guided-missile cruiser serving in the United States Navy. She is named in honor of the Battle of Chosin Reservoir of the Korean War. Commissioned in 1991, she is currently serving in the Pacific Fleet, based at San Diego. The cruiser has participated in Operation Southern Watch, Operation Enduring Freedom, and Operation Iraqi Freedom. She is the first US Navy ship to bear this name.

Operational history 
In March 2003, Chosin was assigned to Cruiser-Destroyer Group One.

In April 2008, Chosin failed her Board of Inspection and Survey (InSurv) examination and was judged "unfit for sustained combat operations." In Spring of 2008, Chosin had received replacement gun barrels for both of her 5-inch guns.

On 6 November 2009, Chosin assumed the role as flagship for the counter-piracy task force Combined Task Force 151. On 17 November 2009, Chosin rescued three stranded Yemeni fishermen in the Gulf of Aden. According to the fishermen, they were left stranded in the water after 12 suspected Somali pirates hijacked their vessel. The fishermen also said that the pirates gave them an ultimatum to either jump overboard with only a wooden plank as a flotation device or be killed. Chosin medical personnel treated the fishermen and gave them food and water. Once the fishermen were deemed to be medically stable, Chosin transferred the fishermen to a Yemen Navy vessel.

In April 2013, Chosin passed its Board of Inspection and Survey (InSurv). On 30 April 2013, Chosin departed her home port of Joint Base Pearl Harbor–Hickam (JBPHH) for a scheduled Western Pacific deployment. While deployed, Chosin was scheduled to conduct theater security operations with partner nations while providing deterrence, promoting peace and security, preserving freedom of the seas and providing humanitarian assistance/disaster response. In October 2013, the cruiser participated in the International Fleet Review 2013 in Sydney, Australia.

For providing assistance to Protecteur, the Canadian government awarded Chosin a Canadian Forces Unit Commendation.

In June 2016, Chosins homeport was changed to San Diego.

In October 2019 it was announced that Chosin  would be shifting to Seattle, WA to complete a Depot Level Modernization Period at Vigor Marine's Harbor Island facility starting in December 2019. Chosin arrived in Seattle in February, 2020.

References

External links

 Official web site
 USS Chosin webpage
 USS Chosin rescues three Yemeni fishermen in the Gulf of Aden

Ticonderoga-class cruisers
Ships built in Pascagoula, Mississippi
1989 ships
Cruisers of the United States